The women's discus F42-46 event at the 2008 Summer Paralympics took place at the Beijing National Stadium at 09:20 on 15 September.
There was a single round of competition, and as there were  only 8 competitors they each had 6 throws.
The competition was won by Wang Jun, representing .

Results

 
WR = World Record. SB = Seasonal Best.

References
 

Athletics at the 2008 Summer Paralympics
2008 in women's athletics